The 2002 United States Senate election in Montana was held on November 5, 2002. Incumbent Democratic U.S. Senator Max Baucus won re-election to a fifth term.

Democratic primary

Candidates 
 Max Baucus, incumbent U.S. Senator

Results

Republican primary

Candidates 
 Mike Taylor, Montana State Senator
 Brad Johnson, businessman
 John McDonald
 Melvin Hanson

Results

General election

Candidates 
 Max Baucus (D), incumbent U.S. Senator
 Stan Jones (L)
 Bob Kelleher (G), attorney
 Mike Taylor (R), Montana State Senator

Campaign 
The 2002 Montana elections got national attention when Baucus's opponent, state senator Mike Taylor, accused Baucus of having implied that Taylor was gay in a campaign ad. The ad was paid for by the Democratic Senatorial Campaign Committee, though designed by the Baucus campaign. The ad, which alleged that Taylor had embezzled funds from the cosmetology school he once owned, showed footage from the early 1980s of Taylor massaging another man's face while wearing a tight suit with an open shirt. Taylor dropped out of the race and Baucus won with 63 percent of the vote.

Debates
Complete video of debate, September 16, 2002

Predictions

Results

See also 
 2002 United States Senate elections

References 

Montana
2002
Senate